The 2010–11 Ugandan Big League is the 2nd season of the official second tier Ugandan football championship.

Overview
The 2010–11 Uganda Big League was contested by 18 teams divided into two groups. The Elgon Group was won by Hoima-Busia FC and the Rwenzori Group was won by Maji FC.  The third promotion place went to BUL Bidco FC who won the promotion play-off.

Clubs within the Big League enter the Ugandan Cup and Misindye FC and Jinja Arsenal FC progressed as far as the Quarter Finals.

League standings
The final league tables are not available for the 2010-11 season.  Details of the teams that formed the constitution of the Elgon and Rwenzori Groups are provided below:

Elgon Group
Bul FC
Entebbe Young FC
Iganga Municipal Council FC
Hoima-Busia FC
Jinja Arsenal FC
Jinja MC Hippos FC
KASE FC
Mbale Heroes FC
Misindye FC

Rwenzori Group
Arua Central FC
Bishop Nankyama FC
Boroboro Tigers FC
CRO FC
Hoima Central Market FC
Jogoo Young FC
Maji FC (also known as Water FC)
Ndejje University FC
Sharing Youth FC

Promotion playoff

Semi-finals
First leg

Second leg

Score 5–5 on aggregate. Iganga progressed to Final as Boroboro refused to participate in replay.

Score 2–2 on aggregate. BUL Bidco FC won 3-0 on penalties.

Final

Championship playoff

Final

Footnotes

External links
 Uganda - List of Champions - RSSSF (Hans Schöggl)
 Ugandan Football League Tables - League321.com

Ugandan Big League seasons
Uganda
2010–11 in Ugandan football